Estelle Akofio-Sowah is a Scottish born, Ghanaian businesswoman and the current CSquared Ghana Country Manager and former Google Ghana country manager. Estelle was once the managing director of BusyInternet, an internet service provider in Ghana.

Early life 
Estelle was born in Scotland to a Ghanaian father. Her family moved to Osu in Ghana when she was 6 months old.

Education 
She attended Ghana International School then to University of Sussex from which she has a degree in Economics and Development Studies and also a Fellow of the second class of the Africa Leadership Initiative-West Africa and a member of the Aspen Global Leadership Network.

Career 
Estelle is the current country lead for Google Ghana. She previously worked as the managing director for Busyinternet , a company that deals with ISP, cybercafe and business incubator. She was the conference and banquet manager at La Palm Royal Beach Hotel and project manager of the National Poverty Reduction Program at ProNet, the local NGO partner to WaterAid UK. She was the President of the Ghana Internet Service Providers Association.

Awards
Estelle was ranked among 2016's Top 50 Corporate Women Leaders in Ghana by WomanRising.

References

Living people
Year of birth missing (living people)